Lai-ye Rudbar (also Romanized as Lā’ī-ye Rūdbār, Lā’ī Rūdbār and Lāy-e Rūdbār) is a village in Zarem Rud Rural District, Hezarjarib District, Neka County, Mazandaran Province, Iran. At the 2006 census, its population was 339, in 97 families.

References 

Populated places in Neka County